Agrostis scabra is a common species of grass known by the common names hair grass, rough bent, rough bent grass, winter bent grass, and ticklegrass. A tumbleweed, it is a bunchgrass native to Asia and much of North America, and widely known elsewhere as an introduced species.

Distribution
It occurs in most of the United States except parts of the Southeast and most of Canada except for the farthest northern regions. It can be found in Mexico and California, and across Alaska to far eastern Asia as far south as Korea.

It is resident in a great variety of habitats, from warm coastal valleys to the alpine climate of high mountain ranges. It has been observed on cliffs, in forests, at forest edges, in meadows and fields, and at the shores of rivers and lakes.

Description
Agrostis scabra is a perennial bunchgrass growing mainly upright in form to heights around 75 centimeters. The leaves are rough with tiny hairs and up to about 14 centimeters long. The inflorescence is a wide open array of spreading, thready branches bearing spikelets each a few millimeters long.

Uses
The tolerance of this grass to alpine climates makes it a good plant to use in revegetating disturbed land in such regions. It's known to respond to burning with increased growth. It is known to spring up on sites where few other plants can grow, such as abandoned coal mines and soils polluted with sulfur, copper, and nickel. Prior to flowering, cattle, sheep, and horses readily consume it; it is also occasionally consumed by wild animals and after flowering by livestock.

References

External links

 Jepson Manual Treatment — Agrostis scabra
 

scabra
Bunchgrasses of North America
Bunchgrasses of Asia
Grasses of the United States
Grasses of Mexico
Grasses of Canada
Native grasses of California
Native grasses of the Great Plains region
Native grasses of Texas
Grasses of Alabama
Flora of Western Canada
Flora of the Canadian Prairies
Flora of Eastern Canada
Flora of the Western United States
Flora of the Eastern United States
Flora of Central Mexico
Flora of Northeastern Mexico
Flora of Northwestern Mexico
Flora of the Sierra Nevada (United States)
Flora of the Rocky Mountains
Flora of Northeast Asia
Flora of Siberia
Flora of Japan
Tumbleweeds
Alpine flora